Harold Kay may refer to:
 Harold Kay (actor)
 Harold Kay (footballer)

See also
 Harold Kaye, English  cricketer
 Harry Kay (disambiguation)